Temnodontosaurus (Greek for "cutting-tooth lizard"temno, meaning "to cut", odont meaning "tooth" and sauros meaning "lizard") is an extinct genus of ichthyosaur from the Early Jurassic period. They lived between 200 and 175 million years ago (Hettangian-Toarcian) in what is now Western Europe (England, France, Luxembourg, Germany and Belgium) and possibly Chile. It lived in the deeper areas of the open ocean. University of Bristol paleontologist Jeremy Martin described the genus Temnodontosaurus as "one of the most ecologically disparate genera of ichthyosaurs," although the number of valid Temnodontosaurus species has varied over the years.

It possessed a tail bend that was characteristic of Jurassic ichthyosaurs and had many conical teeth filling its jaw that were set in a continuous groove.

History of discovery

The first ichthyosaur skull ever discovered was that of Temnodontosaurus platyodon. The specimen (BMNH 2149; now NHMUK PV R1158) was found in the Lias of Lyme Regis by Joseph Anning in 1811. The rest of the skeleton was recovered in 1812 by his sister, Mary Anning, but was later lost and never recovered. The ichthyosaur was subsequently described by the anatomist Sir Everard Home in what was the first scientific description of an ichthyosaur. T. platyodon is the most common species of Temnodontosaurus. The type of skull is currently located at the Natural History Museum in London. The specimen was originally named Ichthyosaurus platyodon but then renamed Temnodontosaurus. The genus Temnodontosaurus was named by Richard Lydekker in 1889.

The species Temnodontosaurus platyodon was named by William Conybeare in 1822 from the specimen BMNH 2003 from the Lyme Regis. The specimen is located at the British Museum of Natural History. T. platyodon is from the Upper Hettangian-Lower Sinemurian. It is the type species for Temnodontosaurus. T. platyodon specimens have been found in England, Germany, Belgium and Luxembourg. This includes the Lyme Regis in Dorset England, Herlikofen in Germany, Arlon in Belgium and Cloche d'or in Luxembourg. Only one known complete skeleton of T. platyodon exists (BMNH 2003), and there is also a well-preserved skull (BMNH R1158).
 
In 1995, Christopher McGowan explained that the previously named T. risor species were really juvenile versions of T. platyodon. The specimen he used to back up his argument was one collected by David Sole in 1987 from Black Ven (East of Lyme Regis). The previously known T. risor specimens (three skulls) were seen as different from the T. platyodon species because they had larger orbits, smaller maxillae and curved snouts. However, McGowan described them as juveniles because of the small size of the forefin relative to the skull. The T. risor skulls are thought to be juveniles because the skull is relatively long compared to the postcranial skeleton.

The species T. acutirostris was initially named by Richard Owen in 1840. This holotype (BMNH 14553) was from the Alum Shale Formation of Lower Toarcian in Whitby, Yorkshire, England. Michael Maisch, in 2000, described it as belonging in the genus Temnodontosaurus. However, in 2010, Maisch published a paper stating that the specimen didn't belong in Temnodontosaurus, as he had thought previously, and should probably be assigned to Ichthyosaurus instead. As of 2022, this species has been placed as species inquirenda.

T. trigonodon was named by von Theodori in 1843. The type specimen for T. trigonodon is an almost complete skeleton from the Upper Liassic of Banz, Germany of the Lower Toarcian. Other specimens have been found in Germany, as well as in France from the Lower Toarcian of Saint Colombe in Yonne. A T. trigonodon specimen from the Upper Toarcian, Aalen, Baden-Württemberg, Germany is at the Staatliches Museum für Naturkunde, Stuttgart in Germany.

The species T. eurycephalus has only one specimen: a holotype. The specimen (R 1157) is a skull and was named in 1974 by McGowan. It is from the Lower Sinemurian, Bucklandi Zone, and was found in Lyme Regis, Dorset, England, in a limestone bed called Broad Ledge. The T. eurycephalus specimen (R 1157) is currently located at the Natural History Museum in London.
 
The validity of the species T. burgundiae has been disputed. In 1995, McGowan proposed Leptopterygius burgundiae should be placed in Temnodontosaurus. The paleontologist Michael Maisch does not see T. burgundiae as belonging to Temnodontosaurus. In 1998, Maisch identified this name as a junior synonym of T. trigonodon. Martin Sander, in 2000, recognsizedT. burgundiae as a separate species, describing specimens from the Toarcian of the Holzmaden area of Germany and France as being Temnodontosaurus burgundiae. However, this again has been met disagreement, for McGowan and Motani (2003) argued that all specimens of the Toarcian T. burgundiae belong to T. trigonodon and that although there are small osteological differences, they are not sufficient enough to keep this species valid.

The species T. azerguensis was described in 2012 by Jeremy Martin of the University of Bristol, based on a holotype that is almost a complete skeleton from the Bifrons ammonite zone of the Middle Toarcian. It was found in 1984 by M. Dejob and Ms. Laurent from the Lafarge Quarry in Belmont d’Azergues, Rhone, France. The specific name derives from the name of the river and valley near the Belmont quarry where it was found: 'Azergues'. It is currently located at the Musee des Amis de la Mine in Saint-Pierre La Palud, Rhone department, France. T. azerguensis is younger than other ichthyosaurs. It had a similar size and postcranial anatomy to other Temnodontosaurus species; however, its cranial morphology differed. The rostrum was more elongated and thin and had a reduced quadrate. Since T. azerguensis either had very small teeth or no teeth at all, it has been proposed that it was probably not effective at eating hard-shelled or bony prey and instead had a diet of smaller and softer prey compared to the other Temnodontosaurus species.

The holotype of T. crassimanus is on display at the Yorkshire Museum; however, it has remained understudied and the validity of the species has long been questioned. Swaby and Lomax (2020) highlighted several morphological features of the postcranial skeleton and determined that T. crassimanus is a valid species of the genus Temnodontosaurus and includes several distinct characters that can be used to distinguish it from T. trigonodon, to which it was once assigned.

The largest temnodontosaurus known, the "Rutland Sea Dragon" about 10 metres long and 181 million years old, was discovered largely intact in 2021 in an English reservoir when water levels were lowered for winter maintenance.

Description

Temnodontosaurus was a large ichthyosaur, with its tail as long as the body or longer. However, the 2015 study argued that the previous studies have overestimated the size of this specimen.

The forefins and hindfins of Temnodontosaurus were of roughly the same length and were rather narrow and elongated. This characteristic is unlike other post-Triassic ichthyosaurs such as the thunnosaurians, which had forefins at least twice the length of their hindfins. It was different from other post-Triassic ichthyosaurs like Ichthyosaurus, possessing an unreduced, tripartite pelvic girdle and having only 3 primary digits with one postaxial accessory digit. Like other ichthyosaurs, the fins exhibited strong hyperphalangy, but the fins were not involved in body propulsion; only the tail was used as the main propulsive force for movement, although it had a weak tail bend at an angle of less than 35°. Its caudal fin has variously been described as either lunate or semi-lunate; it was made of two lobes, in which the lower lobe was skeletally supported whereas the upper lobe was unsupported. The proximal elements of the fin formed a mosaic pattern, while the more distal elements were relatively round. It also had a triangular dorsal fin and had two notches on the fin's anterior margin; the paired fins were used to steer and stabilize the animal while swimming instead of paddling or propulsion devices. It had roughly less than 90 vertebrae, and the axis and atlas of the vertebrae were fused together, serving as stabilization during swimming. T. trigonodon possessed unicipital ribs near the sacral region and the bicipital ribs more anteriorly, which helped to increase flexibility while swimming.

Like other ichthyosaurs, Temnodontosaurus likely had high visual capacity and used vision as its primary sense while hunting. Temnodontosaurus had the largest eyes of any ichthyosaur and of any animal measured. The largest eyes measured belonged to the species T. platyodon. Despite the enormous size of its eyes, Temnodontosaurus had blind spots directly above its head due to the angle at which its eyes were pointed. The eyes of Temnodontosaurus had sclerotic rings, hypothesized to have provided the eyes with rigidity. The sclerotic rings of T. platyodon were at least 25 cm in diameter.

The head of Temnodontosaurus had a long robust snout with an antorbital constriction. It also had an elongated maxilla, a long cheek region, and a long postorbital segment. The carotid foramen in the basisphenoid in the skull was paired and was separated by the parasphenoid. Also, the parasphenoid had a processus cultriformis. T. platyodon and T. trigadon had a very long snout that was slightly curved on its dorsal side and ventrally curved, respectively. It also had many pointed conical teeth that were set in continuous grooves, rather than having individual sockets. This form of tooth implantation is known as aulacodonty. Its teeth typically had two or three carinae; notably, T. eurycephalus possessed bulbous roots, while T. nuertingensis had no canine or bulbous roots.

Palaeobiology

Feeding mechanisms and diet

Temnodontosaurus was an apex predator in the Early Jurassic seas. Its diet likely consisted mainly of vertebrates such as fish, plesiosaurs and other ichthyosaurs. It may have also preyed on cephalopods. It is the only Jurassic ichthyosaur genus for which a mainly-vertebrates diet has been proposed. One T. trigonodon specimen (located at the Staatliches Museum für Naturkunde in Stuttgart) shows remains of Stenopterygius, another ichthyosaur, in its abdominal cavity. Due to its more robust teeth and deeper jaw, T. eurycephalus probably ate large prey such as other ichthyosaurs, while species with pointed but more modest-sized teeth, such as T. platyodon, perhaps preferred soft-bodied prey and smaller vertebrates such as fish.  Temnodontosaurus likely utilised ram feeding methods of predation. The movements of its jaw were likely rapid and so it probably used snapping rather than chewing mechanisms to eat its prey.<ref name="Thies, D. & Hauff, R.B. (2013)">Thies, D. & Hauff, R.B. (2013). A Speiballen from the Lower Jurassic Posidonia Shale of South Germany”. – N. Jb. Geol. Paläont. Abh., 267: 117–124; Stuttgart</ref>Scheyer, Torsten M. et al. (2014). Early Triassic Marine Biotic Recovery: The Predators’ Perspective. PLoS ONE 9.3 (2014): e88987

Swimming and movement style
Like other ichthyosaurs, Temnodontosaurus was a fast cruiser or swimmer. Jurassic ichthyosaurs such as Temnodontosaurus swam via the lateral oscillation of their caudal fluke on a flexible tailstock. T. trigonodon had a highly flexible, long, thin body with a high vertebral count and modest regional differentiation. It used its large limbs as rudders. Its style of swimming was thunniform, unlike more basal ichthyosaurs whose swimming was anguilliform. This trait can be inferred in Temnodontosaurus and other Jurassic and post-Jurassic ichthyosaurs because of their semi-lunate tail fins and shortened bodies relative to the tail.

ClassificationTemnodontosaurus is the only genus in the family Temnodontosauridae.McGowan, C. (1974). "A revision of the longipinnate ichthyosaurs of the Lower Jurassic of England, with descriptions of two new species (Reptilia, Ichthyosauria)". Life Sciences Contributions, Royal Ontario Museum 97: 1–37 The family Temnodontosauridae was described by C. McGowan and is from the Lower Liassic. Temnodontosauridae is part of the monophyletic group Neoichthyosauria, a clade named by Martin Sander in 2000 that includes the families Temnodontosauridae, Leptonectidae and Suevoleviathanidae. Temnodontosaurus is one of the most basal post-Triassic ichthyosaurs.
 
The cladogram below is based on Maisch and Matzke (2000) and Maisch and Matzke (2003) with clade names following Maisch (2010):

The 2022 study which revived T. zetlandicus created a new majority rule consensus cladogram based on "non-clock Bayesian analysis," which found T. azerguensis to be too distant in relation compared to other species of Temnodontosaurus. The study also removed T. acutirostris from the genus, placing it as species inquirenda.

Palaeoecology
The habitat of Temnodontosaurus was the open ocean, away from the shoreline. It lived in the pelagic zone of the water column and didn't associate with the seafloor.

Fossils of Temnodontosaurus have been found in England, Germany and France from rocks associated with marine environments. Specimens have been found especially in the Lias of the Lyme Regis in Dorset, England. The Lias is made up of alternating units of limestone and mudstone and contains many ammonites. The newly described species T. azerguensis was found in a belemnite rich marlstone bed in the Bifrons ammonites zone, Middle Toarcian, in Belmont d’Azergues, Rhone, France.Temnodontosaurus'' fossils have been found in the Posidonia Shale near Holzmaden, Germany. The Posidonia Shale is composed of black bituminous shales with intercalated bituminous limestone. The environment is known to have been marine because fossils of marine animals such as plesiosaurs, crocodylians and especially ammonites have been found there in abundance.

See also

 List of ichthyosaurs
 Timeline of ichthyosaur research

References

Early Jurassic ichthyosaurs
Ichthyosaurs of Europe
Ichthyosauromorph genera